Ocean Ramsey is a freediver and model. She operates One Ocean Diving, LLC in Hawaii, a company which facilitates dives with marine life. She gained international media attention for free diving with sharks, including great white sharks, to bring attention to sharks and her business. Ramsey is based in Hawaii, and has dived with 47 species of sharks around the world as of 2019.

The encounter was captured by Ramsey’s fiancé, Juan Oliphant, and the footage received worldwide media attention.

While she has been praised for raising awareness of the species, she has been criticized for her actions in the footage. Marine biologist Michael Domeier, founding director of the non-profit Marine Conservation Science Institute, criticized Ramsey for appearing in the viral shark interaction video. David Shiffman, a marine conservation biologist who studies sharks, told The Washington Post: "I can't believe that 'please don't grab the 18-foot long wild predator' is something that needs to be explicitly said out loud, but here we are."

References

Living people
American conservationists
1987 births